Frazier Park is an unincorporated community and census-designated place in Kern County, California. It is one of the Mountain Communities of the Tejon Pass. The population was 2,592 in the 2020 census, down from 2,691 in 2010.

History

The earliest record relating to Frazier Park was a report in 1854 that lumber was being produced there from Frazier Mountain trees for use at the new Army post at nearby Fort Tejon. Local historian Bonnie Ketterl Kane wrote that the mill was "supposedly" at the southeast end of the present community. She cited another report that a Kitanemuk Indian referred to the site as Campo del Soldado (Soldier's Camp), "which was where the soldiers stayed when they cut timber from a mountain they called Pinery Mountain, today's Frazier Mountain."

The community was established in 1925 by Harry McBain, who named it in 1926 for Frazier Mountain, on its southern flank. Its post office was established on September 14, 1927, with Charles B. Fife as the first postmaster.

Frazier Park was used in filming for The Waltons television show.

Frazier Park is the setting of the 2011 film The FP and 1974's The Black Six.

Geography

Frazier Park lies within Cuddy Canyon in the San Emigdio Mountains, within the Los Padres National Forest.

Other nearby communities include Lake of the Woods, Lebec, Pine Mountain Club , and Mettler. Santa Clarita is the nearest large city to the south on Interstate 5 (I-5), and Bakersfield is the largest city to the north of Interstate 5 (I-5).

The San Andreas fault transects the region, turning southeast on the west side of Interstate 5, just southwest of the Frazier Park exit in what is known as the Big Bend of the San Andreas. The Garlock Fault, California's second largest, intersects the San Andreas just east of town and heads northeast along the Tehachapi Mountains.

The nearest highway is Interstate 5, east of the community. The main road through Frazier Park is Frazier Mountain Park Road, which runs east to Lebec and I-5 and west to Lake of the Woods.

Climate
This region experiences warm (but not hot) and dry summers, with no average monthly temperatures above .  According to the Köppen Climate Classification system, Frazier Park has a warm-summer Mediterranean climate, abbreviated "Csb" on climate maps.

Population

2010
The 2010 United States Census reported that Frazier Park had a population of 2,691. The racial makeup of Frazier Park was 2,297 (85.4%) White, 16 (0.6%) African American, 31 (1.2%) Native American, 22 (0.8%) Asian, 3 (0.1%) Pacific Islander, 212 (7.9%) from other races, and 110 (4.1%) from two or more races. Hispanic or Latino of any race were 528 persons (19.6%).

The Census reported that 2,691 people (100% of the population) lived in households, 0 (0%) lived in non-institutionalized group quarters, and 0 (0%) were institutionalized.

There were 1,086 households, out of which 342 (31.5%) had children under the age of 18 living in them, 487 (44.8%) were opposite-sex married couples living together, 116 (10.7%) had a female householder with no husband present, 69 (6.4%) had a male householder with no wife present.  There were 83 (7.6%) unmarried opposite-sex partnerships, and 7 (0.6%) same-sex married couples or partnerships. 312 households (28.7%) were made up of individuals, and 97 (8.9%) had someone living alone who was 65 years of age or older. The average household size was 2.48.  There were 672 families (61.9% of all households); the average family size was 3.08.

The population included 643 people (23.9%) under the age of 18, 243 people (9.0%) aged 18 to 24, 616 people (22.9%) aged 25 to 44, 874 people (32.5%) aged 45 to 64, and 315 people (11.7%) who were 65 years of age or older.  The median age was 40.4 years. For every 100 females there were 100.7 males.  For every 100 females age 18 and over, there were 102.0 males.

The homeowner vacancy rate was 4.5%; the rental vacancy rate was 10.0%.  1,627 people (60.5% of the population) lived in owner-occupied housing units and 1,064 people (39.5%) lived in rental housing units.

2000
A total of 2,348 people lived in Frazier Park in 2000, of which 2,055 (87 percent) were white. Other residents included 34 American Indians or Alaska natives, 19 Asians, and 14 blacks. There were 292 Hispanics or Latinos of any race.

The median age for Frazier Park residents was 38 years compared with 35 for the nation as a whole.

Frazier Park also had slightly more veterans than its share — 293, or 17%, compared to 13% around the country.

It had a significantly higher percentage of disabled people than the rest of the nation — 36% vice 19%.

In contrast with the country at large, where 64% of adults were working, Frazier Park had 48% employed. Those who were working had to travel some 42 minutes to their jobs, compared to 25 minutes for most Americans.

Frazier Park households had a lower median income than the nation as a whole — $46,857, compared to $50,046.

There were 291 people (12%) below the poverty level in Frazier Park in 2000. That is the same proportion as the entire country.

Almost a quarter of Frazier Park's 1,203 housing units (23%) were vacant when the census was taken in March 2000 — much higher than the national rate of 9%.  This may be explained by the fact that many Frazier Park properties are second or seasonal homes.  Property owners lived in about seven of every 10 occupied units, renters in the other three — nearly the same as the remainder of the nation.

Government

Frazier Park is governed by the Kern County Board of Supervisors. On August 13, 2009, County Supervisor Ray Watson announced that he wanted to appoint a Town Mayor and an advisory council to assist him in the governance of the area, which includes Frazier Park, Lebec, Fort Tejon and Tejon Village, Pinon Pines, Lake of the Woods, and Pine Mountain Club. A resolution to form the Mountain Communities Municipal Advisory Council and its bylaws would be brought to the Kern County Board of Supervisors for approval, he said.

The five members he selected for initial appointment for the advisory council were Stacey Havener, Linda MacKay, Steve Newman, Robert Peterson, Anne Weber and Thomas Lauchlan as Town Mayor. "These individuals were selected based on demonstrated leadership, community service and broad representation of community interests and geographic areas," Watson said. "We are leaving open the option to extend membership to seven at some point depending on the need to represent additional interests within the communities.

Havener, a real estate broker and president of the Mountain Communities Chamber of Commerce, lived in Pine Mountain Club. MacKay of Frazier Park worked for the Family Resource Center. She served two terms on the Mountain Communities Town Council, one term as president. She was one of the original group that researched and suggested the formation of MCMAC. Newman, retired after 34 years as a sergeant of the Los Angeles Sheriff Department, lived in Frazier Park.  He was a member of the El Tejon Unified School District Board for nine years, four of them as chairman. Peterson of Lebec worked for Tejon Ranch. He had 28 years of experience in real estate, land planning, economic development and maintenance of sustainable development standards. He served on the Tehachapi Fire Safety Council. Weber lived in Frazier Park. She established the Mountain Communities Family Resource Center in 1999.

Town Council 
As unincorporated areas, the Mountain Communities have no local government, but they were served by the volunteer Mountain Communities Town Council, formed in 1995 "to provide a stronger local voice in community development" and to be "a liaison between various government agencies and the community at large." The first officers were Bob Anderson, president; Fred Rose, vice president; Richard Haugh, treasurer, and Ana Soares, secretary. The highest number of votes cast was 184 for Sanchez.

Electioneering was frustrating for council members because Kern County officials denied their request to allow a vote at the same time residents balloted in county elections. The council also tried putting a mail-in ballot in the local newspaper.

As a result, a proposal was made in 2006 to the local county supervisor, Raymond A. Watson, to strengthen the council, but, according to the local newspaper, The Mountain Enterprise, it "received a chilly response." Rose said that Watson rejected a proposal to establish an elected municipal advisory council as allowed by state law.

During the 2004-2009 period, the council held a number of forums, which attracted more than a thousand people considering subjects ranging from wildfire evacuations to land-development proposals. In 2007, the California Air Resources Board lent it equipment to test air quality in Lebec.

The Town Council voted to dissolve itself, with its last meeting held on October 16, 2008. At that time, the council decided to bring the matter of a municipal advisory council — or MAC — before Watson again.

Municipal Advisory Council 
Rose thereupon sent a letter to Watson on behalf of a "Mountain Communities MAC/CSD Working Group" for establishment of an elected municipal advisory council, or MAC, with a budget of $10,000, along with a part-time clerk and space at the supervisor's office in Frazier Park. It would cover only the Kern County part of the Mountain Communities.

Watson responded to a query from The Mountain Enterprise thatI am opposed to any new layer of government that adds significant costs and bureaucracy. … The idea of a municipal advisory committee or perhaps some other local representative would be strictly advisory. Ultimately, decisions for the Mountain Communities will lie with the elected Supervisor, whoever that is."On February 23, 2009, an open meeting of about 75 people was held in Frazier Park under the control of Supervisor Watson. A poll by show of hands revealed about 40 in favor of a MAC, 7 opposed, and 20 undecided, with others not voting.

On August 14, 2009, Watson announced he would recommend the formation of a Municipal Advisory Council to the Kern County Board of Supervisors, with the first members to be Stacy Havener of Pine Mountain, Linda MacKay of Lebec, Steve Newman of Cuddy Valley, Robert Peterson of Lebec, and Anne Weber of Frazier Park.

In 2013 the organization, dubbed MCMAC, contained 4,370 registered voters among the area's 8,384 Kern County residents.

Few local residents attended the council's meetings. MacKay resigned from the body after five months, saying that it had been "hijacked" by Watson to be a rubber stamp and that she was appointed for "token diversity." Watson appointed no one to fill MacKay's seat.The people of the mountain communities began to boycott the meetings. The MCMAC often met to empty rooms: four people talked to each other and empty chairs for nearly three years.In April 2012 both candidates to succeed Watson—David Couch and Harley Pinson—each said he favored an elected Mountain Communities Advisory Council, and after Couch won the election, the remaining four council members resigned.

The town council never returned to the area.

2020 June 
In June 2020 a new town council was organizing with the intention of uniting the community and saving many local businesses and community development programs. A community roads district is one of the goals.

Education

The community is a part of the El Tejon Unified School District. Frazier Park Elementary School is the only non-charter school that lies within Frazier Park; it educates children in kindergarten through fourth grade.  El Tejon Middle School in Lebec takes district students from the fifth through the eighth grade. Frazier Mountain High School, also in Lebec,  was founded in 1995 for ninth- through 12th-graders.

Homeschooling is important in Frazier Park and surrounding areas, according to a March 2008 report in the Mountain Enterprise, which added:

Per capita, the Mountain Communities may have one of the highest rates of homeschooling in the state, far above the national average of 2% to 4%, Holly Van Houten . . . [a home-school parent of the area] said. Estimates range between 8% and 30% — somewhere between 100 and 400 children, she reports.

Frazier Park hosts a branch of the Valley Oaks Community Charter School, headquartered in Bakersfield. The charter school is designed to "provide opportunities, support, and accountability for parents in their homeschooling endeavors."

Transportation

Kern Transit provides weekday service from the Flying J gas station via the Route 130 bus to the Santa Clarita Station Metrolink and the McBean Regional Transit Center, which includes many connecting bus routes, including to North Hollywood Station and elsewhere.

Kern Transit also provides bus service Monday through Saturday during the summer months to Lebec, Gorman, Lake of the Woods, Pinon Pines, and Pine Mountain Club. It offers a dial-a-ride service all year.

In popular culture

The Black Six (1973), a blaxploitation biker film directed by Matt Cimber and featuring several NFL stars was made in the area.

In 2011, an American independent film The FP was released. The comedy film written and directed by brothers Brandon and Jason Trost focuses on two gangs—the 248 and the 245—that are fighting for control of The FP (Frazier Park).

In 2017, the film Frazier Park Recut was released by filmmaker Tom Morris. It was filmed on location in Frazier Park.

The Clones (1973) was shot partially on location in Frazier Park.

References

External links

Newspapers
The Mountain Enterprise, weekly newspaper
The Bakersfield Californian The Californian discontinued circulation in the Mountain Communities effective May 1, 2009. Source: Mountain Enterprise, April 3, 2009

Organizations
Center of the World Festival
Rotary Club of Frazier Park and Mountain Communities
Mountain Communities Chamber of Commerce

Other
Frazier Park data from city-data.com
Kern County official site
 The disappearance of the lake in Frazier Park, 2016-2021 (video)

Mountain Communities of the Tejon Pass
Census-designated places in Kern County, California
San Emigdio Mountains
1925 establishments in California
Populated places established in 1925